The Secret Hide-Out is a children's novel written and illustrated by children's author John Peterson, who also created The Littles. It was originally published as a hardback title by Four Winds Press in 1965, then became a long-running paperback for Scholastic Press and its book clubs, through the 1970s.

The book is an adventure story about two brothers, Matt and Sam Burns, who discover the minutes book of the Viking Club, a kind of junior secret society of boys from a generation or so earlier. While Sam wants to skip the log's details and go straight to look for their old meeting place (the Secret Hide-Out), Matt wants to see if they can first pass the club's membership tests, as they are explained, and be "worthy" of going as prospective members... if the Hide-Out still exists. Another local boy called Beany joins them in their quest... and as it turns out, an original Viking Club member who learns of their plan prepares to meet them.

While the book does not include the complete "original" Viking Club log, it does include enough details and illustrations to show how such a club would initiate new members, and a style for presentation and decorum. A section in the back gives full instructions on making regalia for club members, including masks, whistles, shields and (dull-pointed) spears. These could be easily made by the book's target audience, with mostly household materials, a bushel-basket lid being the hardest item to obtain.

The Viking Club was apparently based on Peterson's son Matt's own Viking Club, and the book doubtless inspired any number of "secret clubs" among its readers. A sequel to the book, Enemies of the Secret Hide-Out, appeared in 1966, and was also a longtime title for Scholastic. In this story, two boys try out for membership; when one is disqualified for cheating, he starts a rival club, and threatens to learn and expose the location of the hide-out.

See also

References

External links
 https://archive.org/details/secrethideout00pete

1965 American novels
American children's novels
1965 children's books